László Pákozdi Gröschl (30 June 1916 – 23 March 1993), known in Spanish as Ladislao Pakozdi, was a Hungarian naturalized Chilean football player and manager.

Club career
From 1936 to 1944, Pákozdi played for both Elektromos TE and Salgótarjáni SE in Hungary. After the World War II, he emigrated to Latin America and joined Botafogo in Brazil in 1947. Next he moved to Chile and played for Santiago Morning and Universidad Católica.

International career
From 1939 to 1940, he made nine appearances for the Hungary national team.

Managerial career

In Chile
He managed several clubs in the Chilean football. He began his managerial career in Audax Italiano, with whom he won the 1957 Primera División de Chile, the fourth title for the club. As a curiosity, in his playing career Pákozdi was characterized by having a strong shot, and as manager he used to take part in the training sessions. So, in an occasion, he injured the hand of the substitute goalkeeper, Donoso.

In addition, he managed Rangers de Talca, San Luis de Quillota, O'Higgins, Palestino and Unión La Calera.

In Peru
From 1966 to 1967 he managed both Atlético Grau and Alianza Lima in Peru, becoming the first European football manager in the Peruvian Primera División.

Chile national team
In 1957, Pákozdi managed Chile in six matches: two matches of the 1957 Copa Bernardo O'Higgins and four matches of the 1958 FIFA World Cup qualification.

Personal life
His original surname was Pfandler and was nicknamed Pupu. He made his home in Chile and acquired the Chilean nationality.

He is the father of the Chilean former tennis player Mario Pakozdi.

Honours

Manager
Audax Italiano
 Primera División (1): 1957

Chile
 Copa Bernardo O'Higgins (1): 1957

References

External links
 László Pákozdi at NationalFootballTeams
 László Pákozdi at Partidos de la Roja (in Spanish)
 László Pákozdi at PlayMakerStats

1916 births
1993 deaths
Hungarian footballers
Hungary international footballers
Botafogo de Futebol e Regatas players
Santiago Morning footballers
Club Deportivo Universidad Católica footballers
Nemzeti Bajnokság I players
Campeonato Brasileiro Série A players
Chilean Primera División players
Hungarian football managers
Hungarian expatriate football managers
Naturalized citizens of Chile
Chilean football managers
Chilean expatriate football managers
Audax Italiano managers
Rangers de Talca managers
Chile national football team managers
San Luis de Quillota managers
O'Higgins F.C. managers
Club Deportivo Palestino managers
Club Alianza Lima managers
Unión La Calera managers
Chilean Primera División managers
Peruvian Primera División managers
Expatriate footballers in Brazil
Expatriate footballers in Chile
Hungarian expatriate sportspeople in Brazil
Hungarian expatriate sportspeople in Chile
Expatriate football managers in Chile
Expatriate football managers in Peru
Hungarian expatriate sportspeople in Peru
Chilean expatriate sportspeople in Peru
Place of birth unknown